Zabrus ovalis is a species of ground beetle in the Pelor subgenus. It was described by Léon Fairmaire in 1859 and is found in Algeria and Tunisia.

References

Beetles described in 1859
Beetles of North Africa
Zabrus